Payload Aerospace S.L. (PLD Space) is a Spanish company developing two partially-reusable launch vehicles called Miura 1 and Miura 5.

Miura 1 is designed as a sounding rocket for sub-orbital flights to perform research or technology development in microgravity environment and/or in the upper atmosphere. Furthermore, Miura 1 is also serving as the technological demonstrator of the orbital launcher Miura 5.  Miura 5 will provide orbital launch capabilities for small payloads such as CubeSats, that need a flexible and dedicated launch vehicle and therefore can not fly with traditional launch vehicles. It is being designed to deliver a total payload mass up to  into low Earth orbit.

Recovery of the first stage would be by the use of parachutes and splashdown for re-use.

History
PLD Space was founded in 2011 by Raúl Torres, Raúl Verdú and José E. Martínez in Elche, Spain, and as of 2019 it employs 70 people. In August 2017 the company headquarter moved to new facilities in the Elche Industrial Park, where the assembly facilities for Miura 1 are located.

Since 2014, the company is operating an engine test stand located at the Airport in Teruel, where they performed the first test of its liquid fuel engine on July 1, 2015. It was the first time a liquid rocket engine was tested in Spain, and the first time a private company in Europe tested a liquid rocket engine on its own facilities. PLD Space plans to expand their test facilities to include a vertical test stand to qualify the complete Miura 1 suborbital rocket.

In early August 2018, PLD Space and the Teruel Airport Consortium signed the concession of a 13,337 m2 space at the airport for the PLD Space to test launcher technology. The agreement has a period of 25 years, with the option of an additional 10-year extension. PLD Space will invest euro €1M in infrastructure for the construction of a new control room, offices, access paths, a rocket engine maintenance hangar and a new test bench to test the complete Miura 1 rocket.

In November 2018 PLD Reached an agreement with INTA to launch Miura 1 from El Arenosillo. The agreement is not limited to using the INTA facilities for launching but rather establishing a lasting relationship that will allow them to develop scientific, aerospace and technical knowledge.

In July 2019, PLD Space reached an agreement with CNES to study the launch of Miura 5 from CSG, French Guiana. As part of their agreement, INTA is also helping them procure a launch site, being El Hierro Launch Centre the best option from a technical point of view.

The company plans to launch their first Miura 1 vehicle in the second quarter of 2023 from El Arenosillo Test Centre.

Funding

The company has been funded through a series of investment rounds with institutional and private sources and up to now gathered investments worth around $10 million. In 2013 they closed a $1.6 million investment round, including a seed contract with the Spanish Government through the Centre for the Development of Industrial Technology (CDTI).

PLD Space secured its first commercial contract as one of the partners in the Small Innovative Launcher for Europe (SMILE) program with the European Commission and the German Aerospace Center (DLR) in December 2015. The company is responsible for testing liquid propulsion engines for the DLR at its propulsion test facilities in the Airport of Teruel. In April 2016, PLD Space secured a further $1.56 million from Spain's TEPREL reusable launcher engine program. TEPREL (Acronym for Spanish Reusable Propulsion Technologies for Launchers) will help PLD Space to continue their liquid rocket engine program,\ the first one in Spain dedicated to boost the small satellite industry in Europe. This project will help PLD Space to develop a 35 kN rocket engine qualified for flight.

In October 2016, The European Space Agency (ESA) selected PLD Space as the prime contractor for the "Liquid Propulsion Stage Recovery" project (LPSR) as part of the agency's Future Launchers Preparatory Programme (FLPP). The goal of this project is to study a strategy to recover the first stage of a launcher, making it partially reusable, with a prospected funding of $800,000. In a second investment round, closed in January 2017, the company secured $7.1 million, $3.2 million of that contributed by GMV. GMV also took the role to develop the complete avionics of Miura 1 and Miura 5, including guidance, navigation and control (GNC), telemetry and onboard software for both launchers. PLD Space received further $2.34 million in January 2018 through the European Commissions Medium-sized Enterprises (SME) Instrument Phase 2, as part of the European Union's Horizon 2020 program for research and innovation, a grant to support to the development of a pair of launchers designed for small satellites. In February 2018 PLD Space was one of the five companies chosen by ESA to perform a feasibility study proposing an economically viable, commercially self-sustaining microlauncher. For this, the company received a funding of $368,000. In September 2020, PLD Space secured €7 million Series B funding from Arcano partners.

Vehicles

Miura 1

Miura 1 is a one-stage suborbital recoverable launch vehicle capable of suborbital flight. It is slated to be the first recoverable launch vehicle in Europe. It uses a  TEPREL-B engine, also designed and produced by PLD Space.

Miura 5 

Miura 5 is a 25 m long two-stage launch vehicle capable of placing up to 300 kg of load in a 500 km heliosynchronous orbit. It uses 5  TEPREL-C engines.

Facilities

PLD Space Propulsion Test Facilities

El Arenosillo Test Centre
PLD Space has reached an agreement with the Instituto Nacional de Técnica Aeroespacial for the use of the facilities of the El Arenosillo Test Centre (CEDEA) for the launch of the Miura 1 vehicle and tests of the Miura 5.

References

External links
 

Commercial launch service providers
Private spaceflight companies
Rocket engine manufacturers of Spain
Spacecraft manufacturers
2011 establishments in Spain
Companies based in the Valencian Community
Spanish brands
Aerospace companies of Europe
Aerospace companies of Spain